A number of beauty pageants may be known by variants of Miss Philippines, including:

Miss Universe Philippines, a national beauty pageant that selects Philippine representative to Miss Universe
Miss World Philippines, a beauty pageant that selects Philippine representatives to Miss World, and to minor international beauty pageants such as Miss Supranational, Miss Eco International, Reina Hispanoamericana, and Miss Eco Teen International
Miss Philippines Earth, a beauty pageant that selects Philippine representative to Miss Earth
Binibining Pilipinas, a beauty pageant that selects Philippine representatives to Miss International, and to minor international beauty pageants such as Miss Intercontinental and The Miss Globe
Miss Grand Philippines, a beauty pageant that selects Philippine representatives to Miss Grand International
Mutya ng Pilipinas, a beauty pageant that selects the Philippine representatives to Miss Asia Pacific International, and other international beauty pageants such as Miss Tourism International, World Top Model, and the inaugural Miss Mutya International
Hiyas ng Pilipinas, a beauty pageant that selects the Philippine representatives to minor international beauty pageants such as Miss Tourism World, Miss Tourism Queen International, and Miss Elite World

See also
Philippines at the Big Four international beauty pageants

Beauty pageants in the Philippines